Yeosu Airport is an airport in Yeosu, South Korea . In 2018, 590,112 passengers used the airport.

Airlines and destinations

Ground transportation

City Bus
 No. 31, 32, 33, 34, 35, 96

References
Yeosu Airport (in English)

Airports in South Korea
Yeosu
Airports established in 1972
1972 establishments in South Korea
20th-century architecture in South Korea